King Street may refer to:

Roads

Australia
King Street, Melbourne, Victoria
King Street, Newtown, New South Wales
King Street, Perth, Western Australia
King Street, Sydney, New South Wales

Canada
King Street, Toronto, Ontario
King Street, Hamilton, Ontario
King Street, Dundas, Hamilton, Ontario 
King Street, Waterloo, Ontario

Channel Islands
King Street, Saint Helier, Jersey

United Kingdom
King Street, Bristol, England
King Street, Cambridge, England
King Street, London, City of London, England
King Street, Hammersmith, London, England
King Street, St James's, London, England
King Street, Manchester, England
King Street (Roman road), in eastern England
King Street, Aberdeen, Scotland
King Street, Kilmarnock, Scotland

United States
King Street District, Jacksonville, Florida
State Street (Boston), Massachusetts, known as King Street between 1708 and 1784
King Street (Alexandria, Virginia)

Other uses
King Street, Essex, a hamlet in England
King Street Gaol (1798), in Toronto, Ontario, Canada
King Street Gaol (1824), in Toronto, Ontario, Canada
King Street Wharf, a former maritime industrial area in Sydney Harbour, New South Wales, Australia

See also
 List of streets named after Martin Luther King Jr.
 King Street Bridge (disambiguation)
 King Street station (disambiguation)